The 1973–74 Minnesota Fighting Saints' season was the Minnesota Fighting Saints' second season of operation in the World Hockey Association (WHA).

Regular season

Final standings

Game log
Source:

Playoffs

Minnesota Fighting Saints 4, Edmonton Oilers 1 - Semifinals

Houston Aeros 4, Minnesota Fighting Saints 2 - Division Finals

Player stats

Source:

Note: Pos = Position; GP = Games played; G = Goals; A = Assists; Pts = Points; +/- = plus/minus; PIM = Penalty minutes; PPG = Power-play goals; SHG = Short-handed goals; GWG = Game-winning goals
      MIN = Minutes played; W = Wins; L = Losses; T = Ties; GA = Goals-against; GAA = Goals-against average; SO = Shutouts;

Awards and records

Transactions
Rob Walton was traded to Vancouver Blazers for Jean Tetreault, January 1974.

Bill Goldthorpe was signed to a contract, May 1974.

Draft picks
Minnesota's draft picks at the 1973 WHA Amateur Draft.

Farm teams

See also
1973–74 WHA season

References

Minnesota Fighting Saints seasons
Minn
Minn